Gloucester Civic Trust Limited is a registered charity (number 264719) which exists to promote the appreciate and conservation of Gloucester's heritage. Founded in 1972, the Trust is based in St. Michael's Tower, The Cross, Gloucester GL1 1PA.

Legal status
The Trust is incorporated as a company limited by guarantee, number 01078805.

Governance
The Trust is run by volunteers who sit on different committees who all report to an overall Council of Management.

Finances
In the year ended 31 December 2010 the Trust had gross income of £38,342, compared with £134,974 in 2009 which included a large grant from the Heritage Lottery Fund for the restoration of St. Michael's Tower which cost over £300,000. Net assets of the trust at 31 December 2010 were £86245 (2009 £94416).

Activities
Past achievements of the Trust include:
The restoration of St. Michael's Tower.
Restoring and transforming the Dick Whittington pub
Saving and restoring the Crown Inn
Commissioning the Emperor Nerva Statue
Restoring the Robert Raikes statue in Gloucester Park
The restoration of Ladybellegate House
Involvement with the regeneration of Gloucester Docks
Commissioning the Aviation Murals in Jubilee Gardens

Selected publications 
Hurst, Henry & Hugh Conway-Jones. The Port of Gloucester. 1988.

See also 
Grade I listed buildings in Gloucester

References

External links 
Official website.

Conservation in the United Kingdom
Heritage organisations in England
Charities based in Gloucestershire
History of Gloucester
1972 establishments in England
Organizations established in 1972
Civic societies in the United Kingdom